Battling Buddy is a 1924 American silent Western film directed by Richard Thorpe and starring Buddy Roosevelt, Violet La Plante and William Lowery.

Cast
 Buddy Roosevelt as Buddy West 
 Violet La Plante as Dorothy Parker 
 William Lowery as Pete Hall 
 Kewpie King as Ginger 
 N.E. Hendrix as Fred Burrows 
 Charles E. Butler as Sam White

References

External links
 

1924 films
1924 Western (genre) films
1920s English-language films
American black-and-white films
Films directed by Richard Thorpe
Silent American Western (genre) films
1920s American films